Stevie may refer to:

People with the name

Given name
Stevie (given name), a list of people

People with the nickname or alias
Stevie B, American singer, songwriter and record producer Steven Bernard Hill (born 1958)
Stevie J, stage name of American record producer and songwriter Steven Aaron Jordan (born 1973)
Stevie Lee (1969-2020), aka Puppet, an American midget wrestler, actor, and wrestling promoter also known for appearances in Jackass
Stevie Nicks, stage name of American singer-songwriter, solo-vocalist, and vocalist of Fleetwood Mac
Stevie Rachelle, lead singer of 1980s glam metal band Tuff, born Steven Howard Hanseter
Stevie Ray, ring name of American professional wrestler Lash Huffman (born 1958)
Stevie Ray Vaughan, American blues singer and guitarist
Stevie Richards, ring name of American professional wrestler Michael Stephen Manna (born 1971)
Stevie Smith, English poet and novelist Florence Margaret Smith
Stevie Stone, stage name of American rapper Stephen Williams (born 1981)
Stevie Wonder, stage name of American singer-songwriter, multi-instrumentalist, record producer and activist Stevland Hardaway Morris (born 1950)

Arts, entertainment, and media

Fictional characters
Stevie Ray Botwin, a fictional character in the TV series Weeds
Stephanie Stevie Hunter, a Marvel Comics character
Stephanie "Stevie" Mason, a fictional character in the TV series Knight Rider
Stevie Budd, a fictional character in the TV series Schitt's Creek
Stevie Kenarban, the title character’s best friend on Malcolm in the Middle

Films
Stevie (1978 film), a British biographical film based on the play
Stevie (2002 film), an American documentary

Music
Stevie (album), by Madlib
"Stevie" (Kasabian song), 2014
"Stevie" (Brian Wilson song), 1981
"Stevie" (Spiderbait song), a 1999 sing by Australian alt-rock band Spiderbait
"Stevie", a song from Live! Go for What You Know by Pat Travers

Other uses in arts, entertainment, and media
Stevie (play), a 1977 play by Hugh Whitemore about the life of poet Stevie Smith
Stevie TV, a former TV show
Stevie, a 1969 book by John Steptoe

Other uses
Stevie (text editor)
Stevie Awards, a business award

See also
The Adventures of Stevie V